Skogman Lake is a lake in the U.S. state of Minnesota.

Skogman Lake was named for a Swedish pioneer who settled there.

See also
List of lakes in Minnesota

References

Lakes of Minnesota
Lakes of Chisago County, Minnesota
Lakes of Isanti County, Minnesota